Buchheim is a German surname. Notable people with the surname include:

 Elfriede Buchheim (1900–1995), German painter

Lothar-Günther Buchheim (1918–2007), German author and painter
Michael Buchheim (born 1949), German sport shooter
Ralf Buchheim (born 1983), German sport shooter
Rudolf Buchheim (1820–1879), German pharmacologist

German-language surnames